Hope Channel Deutsch is a German Christian TV channel for Germany and Eastern Europe. It is operated by Stimme der Hoffnung (German for "Voice of Hope") in Germany which is owned by the Seventh-day Adventist Church. Programmes are also broadcast in Russian. Hope Channel Deutsch features programming produced by Adventist churches, colleges, hospitals and institutions, covering religious, health, educational and family life topics. Hope Channel Deutsch is a 24-hour broadcaster on satellite.

Hope Channel Deutsch is part of the Hope Channel network.

See also 

 Media ministries of the Seventh-day Adventist Church
 Hope Channel

References

External links
 

Seventh-day Adventist media
Television stations in Germany